Paulo Valdez is a Canadian former soccer player who played in the USL A-League, and Canadian Professional Soccer League.

Career 
Valdez played in the USL A-League in 1998 with the Vancouver Whitecaps. In 2001, he played with Toronto Supra in the Canadian Professional Soccer League, and featured in the CPSL Championship final against St. Catharines Roma. On September 6, 2017 he was selected for the Vancouver Whitecaps alumni team in a friendly match against Hollywood North.

After his retirement from professional soccer he became an academy coach for the Whitecaps Academy and North Shore Girls SC.

References 

Living people
Canadian soccer players
Vancouver Whitecaps (1986–2010) players
SC Toronto players
A-League (1995–2004) players
Canadian Soccer League (1998–present) players
Association football midfielders
Year of birth missing (living people)